The Palnatokes Bjerg Formation is a geologic formation in Greenland. It preserves fossils dating back to the Cretaceous period.

See also

 List of fossiliferous stratigraphic units in Greenland

References
 

Cretaceous Greenland